Tesco Clubcard (commonly referred to and branded as Clubcard) is the loyalty card of British supermarket chain Tesco.

The Clubcard scheme operates in the United Kingdom, Ireland, Czech Republic, Slovakia, Hungary and several other countries. As of 2017, there were over 17 million users in the United Kingdom.

History
In 1993, Terry Leahy asked the Tesco marketing team to investigate the potential of loyalty cards. In the past Tesco had run Green Shield Stamps as a promotional tool which rewarded people for visits and spend, but gained no customer information. The initial team researched programmes across the world and developed a proposal which showed that a loyalty card could be very effective. The key change since the days of Green Shield Stamps was the ability to track individual customer behaviour cost-effectively using a magnetic stripe card.

In 1994, Grant Harrison attended a conference where Clive Humby from marketing firm dunnhumby was speaking. Dunnhumby was already working with clients such as Cable & Wireless and BMW, and Harrison approached them to help with the loyalty card project. Successful trials throughout 1994 led to the Tesco board asking Harrison and Humby to present to the annual Board strategy session.

The first response from the board came from Tesco's then-chairman Lord MacLaurin, who said, "What scares me about this is that you know more about my customers after three months than I know after 30 years."

Incidents

In January 1995, Frank Riolfo, a former lance-corporal of the Royal Army Medical Corps,  blackmailed Tesco, forcing the introduction of the previously trialled discount card. After first contaminating food with (what turned out to be fake) HIV-infected blood in a store in Kettering, Riolfo demanded payment via Tesco's new loyalty card system.

He specified that the cards were to contain magnetic strips, allowing them to function secretly as ATM cash withdrawal cards. Coded copies of the PIN code were published under his instruction in national newspapers. Clubcard was subsequently launched nationally with a Direct Marketing campaign by Evans Hunt Scott, Terry Hunt's advertising agency.

Customers, including Riolfo's wife, signed up to the scheme and collected a card. Riolfo and his wife then toured the country withdrawing a total of £7,500 cash on 73 occasions until they were eventually caught on 22 April 1995. Frank Riolfo pleaded guilty and was jailed for six years, after appeal. The loyalty card scheme was not discontinued, with Tesco already planning to roll out the trial before the incident.

In the end of 2000, Robert Edward Dyer made a similar attempt at extortion involving Clubcards with a magnetic strip for ATM withdrawals. Dyer sent several letter bombs, one of which exploded when the recipient opened it, before being arrested in February 2001. David Sainsbury, then chairman of J Sainsbury plc, rejected the idea of introducing a similar scheme. However, the effect that Clubcard had on Sainsbury's sales led to the reversal of that decision, with the launch of the Sainsbury's Reward Card in June 1996.

After two slight amendments to the design of cards in the 1990s by Evans Hunt Scott's creative team, the scheme had a major relaunch in 2005 with all members being sent personalised cards and key fobs which could be scanned at the checkout, rather than swiped. The scheme was again relaunched in 2008 with all seven million members once again being sent new design cards and key fobs.  A further redesign in 2017 allowed contactless technology to be embedded in the cards and key fobs.

Abroad

The Tesco Clubcard scheme was introduced into the Republic of Ireland almost immediately after Tesco's acquisition of Power Supermarkets Limited (now Tesco Ireland), and operates in similar fashion. It was originally an extension of the scheme in the United Kingdom, not a separate scheme, so Irish Clubcards could be used in stores in the United Kingdom until 2019. 

In 2007, Tesco Clubcard was first introduced in all Tesco Extra stores in Malaysia and later in all store formats. In Malaysia, every two Ringgit spent earn 1 Clubcard point. By 2014 the scheme had 1.7m cardholders.

The Tesco Clubcard scheme was introduced into Polish Tesco Stores in 2008, and Slovakia at the end of 2009. As of September 2010, these markets had 1.5m and 850,000 cardholders respectively. Though operating in a similar fashion to the scheme in the United Kingdom, it is independent, so Clubcards from other countries cannot be used in Slovakian or Polish stores. In Slovakia every €1 spent gives 1 Clubcard point (or one point per litre of petrol). Clubcard was launched in the Czech Republic and Hungary in 2010.

Benefits
When shopping at Tesco or using Tesco services (such as services from Tesco Bank), Clubcard holders receive points based on the amount spent. For shopping at Tesco they receive one point for every £1 (one point for every €1 in Ireland) they spend, but for most other services, including fuel, one point is awarded for every £2 (€2 in Ireland) spent. Points are accrued and at least four times a year (there are sometimes "surprise mailings") the holder receives a statement and vouchers to the value of points they have saved. (They have to have saved at least 150 points, with a value of £1.50, to receive a voucher.)

Vouchers can be spent in store on shopping or online on grocery home shopping, or used on Clubcard Rewards where they can be worth three times their face value on selected Rewards in the United Kingdom and up to four times their face value in Ireland. These can be used to obtain discounted day trips, magazines, hotel breaks, restaurant tokens and other offers.

As part of the Clubcard 2 launch, it was announced that, from 17 August 2009, all instore and online purchases would attract double points (2 points per £1). Reports indicate that this initiative was successful in increasing the number of active cardholders from 14 million to 15 million in the market year 2009/10. However, this reverted to 1 point for £1 spent at the end of 2011.

Tesco Bank credit cards originally acted also as Clubcards, collecting points from purchases in Tesco stores and online. From May 2010, however, they also collected one additional point for every £4 spent on credit card purchases from any Tesco outlet and one point for every £8 spent outside of Tesco.

Collecting Clubcard Points at Esso
In 2012 Esso launched a nationwide partnership with Tesco that allows Tesco Clubcard holders to collect Clubcard points from Esso fuel stations across the UK.  Clubcard holders can collect points on fuel purchases as well as some shop purchases on Esso fuelling stations. Since 2017, Esso was the exclusive Tesco Clubcard point earn partner outside of Tesco.  On 1 June 2019, Tesco ended its partnership with Esso meaning points can now only be collected when there is an attached Tesco Express Store at the Esso fuel station.

Online Clubcard Boost
Customers can 'boost' their Clubcard vouchers to use for days out, restaurants and holidays by going to the Clubcard website. The range of partners changes sporadically, but usually customers are able to exchange their vouchers for two or three times their value..

Collecting points
Clubcard points can be accumulated by spending money in the following places:
Tesco stores
Tesco.com 
Tesco Bank
Tesco Fuel stations
 Joint Esso & Tesco fuelling stations
Tesco Mobile
Tesco International Calling
Tesco Opticians
Tesco Photo
Tesco Views
Tesco Wine
F&F
Shopper Thoughts

Former benefits

Former partners
Formerly cardholders could earn clubcard points at the following places, although this has since ceased:

 AVIS, earning points ended 1 February 2009
 E.ON UK, ended 2017
 Marriott Hotels, earning points ended 1 April 2008
 National Tyres

Clubcard TV
Tesco announced in February 2013 that it will be launching its own TV and film on demand service. The service would be free to Tesco Clubcard members, with no charges, subscription or contract. On 28 October 2014, the short lived Clubcard TV was closed.

Green Clubcard points
Green Clubcard points were earned when customers re-used bags, or used an alternative such as a Lock & Lock box, or a large cool box, when shopping in store (one point per bag, (or the points equivalent for something like a large cool box for frozen vegetables, the use of which avoided using a number of bags), except in Wales and Northern Ireland), or opted out of receiving bags when shopping online (one point per ten items delivered). They could also be earned by recycling a limited number of products including mobile phones and ink cartridges through Tesco-branded recycling services.

Once earned, Green Clubcard points were equal in value to normal Clubcard points, but they were listed separately on receipts and Clubcard statements. When stores were required to charge 5p for single use carrier bags (under Government Legislation) the Green Clubcard points scheme was closed down..

Clubcard Fuel Save
On 12 March 2014 Tesco launched a new money-saving offer for fuel. Tesco Fuel Save meant that customers could each month earn up to 20p off every litre of fuel. For every £50 that was spent in a Tesco Store or online at Tesco.com, customers received 2p off every litre of fuel.

The scheme was cumulative, meaning customers didn't have to spend £50 all at once (i.e. they could spend £40 in an Extra store and £10 in a Metro store to earn 2p off). Every penny that was spent in any Tesco format (Express, Metro, Superstore, Extra, Homeplus or .com) counted towards the £50 spend.

Customers could then spend the Fuel Save savings in any Tesco petrol filling station (not Esso). Savings were valid until the end of the following calendar month after being earned. Unlike Tesco petrol vouchers the Fuel Save savings could be used at the Pay@Pump. Exclusions from the £50 spend included Tobacco, Lottery, Gift Cards, Baby Formula Milk and Fuel. The scheme ended on 31 August 2015, with redemptions available until 30 September 2015.

In-store Clubcard Boost
Formerly known as the 'Double Up', then relaunched as the 'Clubcard Voucher Exchange', the Clubcard Boost was the new name for Clubcard Rewards; it launched in 2013. The Clubcard Boost in-stores works the same way as the previous schemes (for every £5 in Clubcard Vouchers, customers receive £10 in Clubcard Boost tokens).

As with previous schemes there are only selected departments included: Baby & Toddler, Cosmetics & Fragrance, Clothing, Opticians, and Cook, Home & Dine. The In-store scheme has since ended, although the online scheme where customers can exchange Clubcard vouchers for up to 3 times their value at other retailers is still available.

Privacy concerns
Some Clubcard users have concerns about the information Tesco and Dunnhumby hold and what they do with it. Details of each Clubcard transaction, such as the store, products purchased, and price paid, are stored for up to two years. Applicants are asked to provide personal details such as name, address, and whether they have children. Tesco says this helps them pick vouchers that are relevant to the holder and to monitor trends to help product availability.

Mobile phone applications
Starting in the end of 2010, Tesco launched applications for iPhone, BlackBerry, Android (operating system) and Nokia Ovi, so points can be collected by presenting a barcode on the handset instead of a keyfob or card. This application was relatively simple on launch, offering little more than a barcode, but updates have increased functionality to include features such as the ability to view current offers instore. On 10 July 2017, Tesco released the Clubcard application on the Google Play store.

Contactless Clubcard 
On 5 July 2017, Tesco announced a new contactless Clubcard. This follows a major user interface update of the Clubcard app. New customers can now use the Tesco Clubcard app to sign up to Clubcard straight away, while they shop in store. Existing customers can access their vouchers at the checkout.

Tesco Pay+
In 2015, Tesco introduced a mobile app called PayQwiq. The app lets you pay for your shopping and collect your Clubcard points all in a single scan. The customer must first enter their bank card and Clubcard details. When they are ready to pay at the checkout they must either enter a passcode, use Touch ID or Face ID (on iOS) then scan the QR code. The customer can spend up to £250 per transaction while paying with the app. In 2017, the app was renamed Tesco Pay+.

References

External links
Tesco Clubcard

1995 establishments in the United Kingdom
Customer loyalty programs
Tesco
Extortion attempts against Tesco